The Arnga are an Aboriginal Australian people of the northern Kimberley region of Western Australia.

Name
The Arnga, like the Yeidji/Gwini and Miwa lack a self-defining tribal ethnonym, and for that reason have generally been called the Forrest River people.
The name 'Arnga' means 'unintelligible person'.

Country
It included areas along the King and Pentecost rivers, running west of the Wyndham Gulf to the Durack River, Their inland extension was not deep, going only as far as the river gorges.

Alternative names
 Arawari
 Arawodi
 Guluwarin
 Kolaia
 Kuluwara, Kuluwaran
 Molyamidi
 Woljamidi, Woljamiri
 ?Yamandil

Source:

Notes

Citations

Sources

 

Aboriginal peoples of Western Australia